The tornado outbreak of April 8–9, 1999 was a widespread tornado outbreak that affected the United States in early April 1999. It is best known for producing an F4 that killed four people in the Blue Ash and Montgomery, Ohio, areas.

Confirmed tornadoes

April 8 event

April 9 event

See also
List of North American tornadoes and tornado outbreaks

External links
April 9, 1999 tornado – then–WKRC-TV meteorologist Steve Horstmeyer
Tornado in Cincinnati – Enquirer and Post coverage
April 9, 1999 Blue Ash F4 Tornado – National Weather Service, Wilmington, Ohio Office

1999 natural disasters in the United States
Tornadoes in Indiana
Tornadoes in Ohio
Tornadoes of 1999
History of Cincinnati
F4 tornadoes by date
1999 in Indiana
1999 in Ohio
Tornado outbreak